Justine is a 2020 British romantic drama film directed by Jamie Patterson, starring Tallulah Haddon and Sophie Reid.

Cast
 Tallulah Haddon as Justine
 Sophie Reid as Rachel
 Xavien Russell as Peach
 Sian Reese-Williams as Leanne
 Steve Oram as Dr. Jim
 Kirsty Dillon as Olivia

Release
The film was released to digital platforms on 5 March 2021.

Reception
Emily Maskell of Little White Lies wrote that while the film's dialogue occasionally "borders on cliché", the film's "diligence in rejecting queer abandonment allows for a sincere portrayal of lesbian love where obstacles are presented in isolation from sexuality, an exemption that feels particularly poignant."

Phuong Le of The Guardian rated the film 3 stars out of 5 and wrote that while the film has several "heavy-handed moments", it is still a "poignant study of a young woman struggling to stay afloat."

References

External links
 
 

British romantic drama films
2020 romantic drama films
2020 LGBT-related films
British LGBT-related films